Heywood Road is a rugby stadium in Sale, Greater Manchester, England, which has been the home ground of rugby union  side Sale F.C. since 1905. It was the home ground of spin-off professional club Sale Sharks until they moved to Edgeley Park, Stockport, in 2003. Sale Sharks' 'A' team, the Sale Jets, still play at Heywood Road. 

From the 2016 season, it has also been home to League 1 (rugby league) team Swinton.  The move of Swinton to the ground meant that the General Safety Certificate had to be renewed.  In September 2016, a report by Trafford Council to the Safety at Sports Grounds Sub-Committee recommended that Heywood Road's capacity be reduced from 5,400 to 3,387 for safety reasons.

References

External links
Sale FC official website
Swinton Lions RLFC official website

Rugby union stadiums in England              
Sale Sharks
Sports venues in Greater Manchester
Buildings and structures in Trafford
Sale, Greater Manchester
Sports venues completed in 1905
1905 establishments in England
Rugby league stadiums in England
Swinton Lions